Chasing Through Europe is a 1929 American Pre-Code romance film directed by David Butler and Alfred L. Werker and starring Sue Carol, Nick Stuart and Gustav von Seyffertitz. It was made by the Fox Film Corporation and was released in both silent and part-talkie versions. Most of the film was shot on location in Europe.

Synopsis
Dick Stallings, a newsreel reporter in London, falls in love with Linda Terry a wealthy American woman. Together they travel round Europe interviewing leading politicians and celebrities, while being pursued by a gangster who plans to kidnap Linda.

Cast
 Sue Carol as Linda Terry 
 Nick Stuart as Dick Stallings 
 Gustav von Seyffertitz as Phineas Merrill 
 Gavin Gordon as Don Merrill 
 E. Alyn Warren as Louise Herriot

References

Bibliography
 Solomon, Aubrey. The Fox Film Corporation, 1915-1935. A History and Filmography. McFarland & Co, 2011.

External links

1929 films
1920s romance films
1920s English-language films
Films about journalists
Films set in London
Films shot in Belgium
Films shot in London
Films shot in Naples
Films shot in Paris
Films shot in Rome
American black-and-white films
20th Century Fox films
American romance films
1920s American films